General Motors Theatre (also known as CBC Theatre, Encounter, Ford Television Theatre, and General Motors Presents) was a Canadian television anthology drama series of television plays, which ran on CBC Television under various titles from September 18, 1952, until January 1, 1961, and in the US on ABC from October 5 to November 2, 1958. The series mainly consisted of one-hour episodes of romance, adventure, or mystery stories, with some social realist drama plays.

Cast and crew 
Austin Willis, Patrick Macnee, Barry Morse, and William Shatner were among those who appeared in plays produced in the strand. The series also supported the earlier careers of many Canadian actors, such as James Doohan, who starred in one of the most successful plays in the strand, Flight into Danger in 1956.

The series was a breeding ground for writing and directing talent such as William Kotcheff, Donald Jack, and Arthur Hailey. Hailey's Flight into Danger was later remade as the feature film Zero Hour!, in turn providing the inspiration for the comedy film Airplane!, and was also screened by the BBC in the United Kingdom. It was a significant factor in General Motors Theatre producer — and CBC Supervisor of Drama — Sydney Newman moving to work in the UK, where he later worked on anthology series similar to General Motors Theatre, such as Armchair Theatre and The Wednesday Play.

Canadian run 
First transmitted under the sponsored title on October 5, 1954, a new 60-minute drama was aired each week. As suggested by the title, the program was sponsored by the General Motors automobile company. It was effectively the same series as the unsponsored CBC Theatre, which had run its first season from December 1, 1953, to April 20, 1954, with General Motors becoming the title sponsor for the second season.

Following some concerns, the series moved to a Sunday evening slot in 1956, where it had competed with the American network CBS's enormously popular game show spin-off The $64,000 Challenge in the key Toronto market (where American broadcast signals could be received from across the border), General Motors pulled out and the show disappeared for two years. It returned in 1958 after The $64,000 Question had been cancelled, under the new title General Motors Presents.
 
For its final run in the summer of 1961, the series had not the originally-produced dramas but broadcasts of a bought-in British anthology series called Interplay.

American run 
The show was one of the first Canadian programs to be sold to an American network. ABC had planned to air 39 episodes of the series but aired only five. Renamed Encounter, it was scheduled to follow the western series Colt .45. The program faced competition on CBS from Alfred Hitchcock Presents and The $64,000 Question. Also, NBC at the time aired part of The Dinah Shore Chevy Show.

References

External links 

General Motors Theatre - Canadian Communication Foundation
Information at CBC Television Series 1952 to 1982

1954 Canadian television series debuts
1961 Canadian television series endings
1950s Canadian anthology television series
1960s Canadian anthology television series
Black-and-white Canadian television shows
CBC Television original programming
1958 American television series debuts
1958 American television series endings
1958 Canadian television series debuts
1958 Canadian television series endings
1950s American anthology television series
Black-and-white American television shows
English-language television shows
American Broadcasting Company original programming